Cell 211 is a 2009 Spanish-French prison film directed by Daniel Monzón from a screenplay by Monzón and Jorge Guerricaechevarría and based on the 2003 novel of the same name by Francisco Pérez Gandul. The film stars Luis Tosar, Alberto Ammann, Antonio Resines, Manuel Morón, Carlos Bardem, Luis Zahera, Vicente Romero, Fernando Soto, and Marta Etura. In the film, rookie prison guard Juan Oliver (Ammann) is forced to go undercover as a prisoner after he becomes embroiled in a riot led by Malamadre (Tosar).

Plot 
Juan Oliver reports to work as a prison guard a day early. During his tour of the prison, a falling projectile knocks him unconscious and he is rushed to Cell 211. The projectile is revealed to be a diversion to allow the convicts to riot and hijack control of the prison. Aware of the impending violence, Juan's colleagues flee and leave him in the cell. 

When Juan awakens in the midst of the choas, he pretends to be new inmate convicted of homicide. He is brought to the leader of the riot, Malamadre, who takes Juan under his wing after Juan suggests variations to the riot which will better equip the prisoners for negotiation. In reality, Juan seeks to keep channels of communication alive with the other guards and an incoming SWAT team, who are preparing to storm the prison.

Malamadre discovers that Basque terrorists associated with the ETA are being held in the prison, and seeks to use them as a political bargaining chip during negotiation. As news of the riot become public, a succession of other riots and demonstrations in the Basque Country follow. Afraid of political ramifications within the Basque Country, Spanish ministers hold back on exercising SWAT interference, leaving Juan alone in the prison.

Juan's pregnant wife, Elena, learns about the riot and heads for the prison; there, protestors related to the inmates fight with police, causing Elena to be hit by an officer. A television inside the prison shows the news footage to the prisoners, revealing to Juan that Elena was at the protest. Fearful for her safety, Juan attempts to contact the guards, while Malamadre demands information of all those injured. The authorities respond with a list of four names; infuriated, Malamadre decide to kill one of the ETA prisoners. However, Juan intervenes and suggest they cut off an ear, an act he is forced to perform.

The authorities then provide additional information on the injured and Juan is told Elena is in the hospital, but recovering. Juan insists on talking to her but is rebuffed. Utrilla, the police guard who hit Elena, is suspended. Apache, an inmate close to Malamadre, learns the truth about Juan after contacting a friend in the police through a smuggled cell phone. He tells Juan he will give him a chance to defend himself before letting Malamadre know.

Later, Malamadre has Apache tell Juan that he needs to speak to him. He shows Juan footage from a protestor's cell phone, showing Elena being beaten by Utrilla. Juan insists Utrilla be brought in the prison, where he is confronted by Juan. Juan again insists on talking to Elena, but he learns she and her unborn child have died. In response, the prisoners viciously beat Utrilla until he reveals Juan is a prison guard. He asks Juan to tell the truth; instead, Juan slits Utrilla's throat. 

Malamadre goes against advice to kill Juan, stating he does not believe Utrilla and that Juan's murder of Utrilla showcases his commitment to the prisoner's fight. Juan fails in a suicide attempt in his cell. Malamadre receives a call from the police negotiator, who gives him Juan's employment records, confirming Utrilla's claim, and asks him to work with them in exchange for release. Malamadre still refuses to kill Juan.

The government tell Malamadre they agree to his demands. Juan drags Utrilla's corpse in front of the government liaison and insists the government publicly agree, or they will kill the ETA prisoners. Malamadre tells Juan if GEO invade instead of a public agreement, he will either die, or kill Juan for his betrayal. As the GEO team quench the riot once they storm the prison, Apache kills Juan and severely injures Malamadre, who then works with the government against Apache.

Cast

Production
The film was produced by Vaca Films, Morena Films and Telecinco Cinema alongside Le Fabrique 2 and TVG. The film was fully shot in Zamora, most notably in the old prison of Zamora, unused since the 1980s and revamped for the occasion.

Reception
Cell 211 has received highly positive reviews from international film critics, earning a 98% "Certified Fresh" rating at Rotten Tomatoes from 44 reviews.

Accolades 
An artistic success, the film won eight Goya Awards, including Best Picture, Best Director, Best Actor (Luis Tosar) and Best Adapted Screenplay.

|-
| rowspan = "21" align = "center" | 2010 || rowspan = "16" | Goya Awards || colspan = "2" | Best Film ||  || rowspan = "16" | 
|-
| Best Director || Daniel Monzón ||  
|-
| Best Actor || Luis Tosar || 
|-
| Best Supporting Actress || Marta Etura || 
|-
| rowspan = "2" | Best Supporting Actor || Carlos Bardem || 
|-
| Antonio Resines || 
|-
| Best Adapted Screenplay || Jorge Guerricaechevarría, Daniel Monzón || 
|-
| Best New Actor || Alberto Ammann || 
|-
| Best Original Score || Roque Baños || 
|-
| Best Production Supervision || Alicia Tellería || 
|-
| Best Cinematography || Carles Gusi || 
|-
| Best Editing || Mapa Pastor || 
|-
| Best Art Direction || Antón Laguna || 
|-
| Best Makeup and Hairstyles || Raquel Fidalgo, Inés Rodríguez || 
|-
| Best Sound || Sergio Burmann, Jaime Fernández, Carlos Faruolo || 
|-
| Best Special Effects || Raúl Romanillos, Guillermo Orbe || 
|-
| rowspan = "5" | 19th Actors and Actresses Union Awards || Best Film Actor in a Leading Role || Luis Tosar ||  || rowspan = "5" | 
|-
| Best Film Actor in a Secondary Role || Carlos Bardem || 
|-
| Best Film Actress in a Minor Role || Marta Etura || 
|-
| Best Film Actor in a Minor Role || Luis Zahera || 
|-
| Best New Actor || Alberto Ammann || 
|}

See also 
 List of Spanish films of 2009

References

External links 
 

2009 films
Spanish action drama films
2000s Spanish-language films
Best Film Goya Award winners
2009 action drama films
Films featuring a Best Actor Goya Award-winning performance
Films featuring a Best Supporting Actress Goya Award-winning performance
2000s prison drama films
Telecinco Cinema films
Films scored by Roque Baños
Films with screenplays by Jorge Guerricaechevarría
Films produced by Álvaro Augustin
Films produced by Javier Ugarte
Morena Films films
Vaca Films films
Films based on Spanish novels
Films shot in the province of Zamora
2000s Spanish films
2000s prison films
Spanish prison films